Dolichoderus validus is a species of ant in the genus Dolichoderus. Described by Kempf in 1959, the species is endemic to North America and South America.

References

Dolichoderus
Hymenoptera of North America
Hymenoptera of South America
Insects described in 1959